The Brazilian Army has a large number of active and planned projects, under the modernization plans of the Brazilian Armed Forces, defined in the National Defense White Paper (Portuguese: Livro Branco da Defesa Nacional - LBDN). From 2010, Brazil started a radical change in its military policy, aiming to consolidate itself as the major power of Latin America.

The prospective scenario analysis developed in 2005 by the U.S. Pentagon for the year 2035, foresees a permanent growth of Brazil's influence in international relations. The intensification of projection in the concert of nations and its greater insertion in the global decisions, conduct the Armed Forces to a new structure compatible with the country's new political-strategic status. In 2020, an increase in the defense budget from 1.4% to 2% of the GDP was approved by the MoD.

Active projects

Artillery systems

Since the incorporation of the ASTROS system in 1983, the Army's continue to receive new systems, also conduct the modernization of the active units along the decades. In the last years, the Army placed new orders for the ASTROS 2020 Mk6, along with the new STREV system (Transportable Flight Device Tracking System). The new generation of this artillery system, called ASTROS 2020, is one of the most strategic military programs in Brazil.

The Brazilian Army is in undergoing modernization of the self-propelled howitzer fleet, incorporating since mid-2010s, the American M109A5+, an upgraded version of the A5 comparable to the A6 Paladin in operation in the U.S. Army. As of 2021, 96 systems was in operation. Other units will be incorporated in the 2020s, all of them modernized by BAE Systems in York PA. Around 40 units of the M992 ammunition vehicle was received in the last years along with the new A5+.

In 2018, Brazil placed an order for 120 units of the M198 155 mm howitzer, in order to replace the M114 along the 2020s. The Army's is also replacing the towed mortar's systems, more than 500 units of the RAIADO 120mm was ordered in the mid-2010s, to replace the French RT F1.

Armored vehicles
Brazil are conducting two major projects for the incorporation of new armoured vehicles. Since 2012, Iveco is delivering several units of the VBTP-MR Guarani 6×6 for the Army, as of 2021, more than 500 units are in operation in several armoured brigades all over the country. 2,044 units were ordered in mid-2010s, finish by 2030. The Iveco LMV 4×4 is being incorporated to the inventory, the Army ordered 1,464 units in mid-2010s. The Army is also receiving several units per year of modernized units of the M113 personnel carrier and the EE-11 Urutu.

Anti-aircraft systems
Since the 2010s, the Brazilian Army ordered several RBS 70 NG systems to equip the infantry brigades, and will continue to receive new units along the 2020s. As of 2021, the Army's operated 30 launchers.

Radars
Since the mid-2010s, the Army is undergoing modernization of the radar's inventory, with the SABER M20, M60 and M200, for the air defense and ground radar roles, with operational ranges from 75 to 400 km. This systems, along with the new STREV system, are combined with ASTROS, RBS 70, RBS 70 NG and 9K38 Igla already in operation in infantry brigades. Brazil continues to incorporate the new EDT-FILA radar, this system is used along with the ASTROS, Oerlikon, Bofors 40mm L/70 and the Flakpanzer Gepard.

Armaments
The Army develop and incorporate along with Avibras, the cruise missile AV-TM 300. This missile can be used along with the ASTROS system, with an operational range from 30 km to 1,000 km carrying a warhead from to 500 kg. The missile is also in operation in the artillery brigades of the Brazilian Marine Corps. The main assault and battle rifles, such the M964 FAL, M964A1 ParaFAL and the IMBEL MD97 are in undergoing replacement by the IMBEL IA2.

Aircraft

Since 2008, Brazil receive annually several units from different types of helicopters, from Helibras factory in Itajubá, Minas Gerais. The units are the Eurocopter EC 725 Caracal,  AS532 Cougar, AS565 Panther and the AS550 Fennec. The Brazilian Army also ordered more ten Sikorsky UH-60 Black Hawks in 2009, and eight Short C-23 Sherpas in 2017.

Satellites
Since 2010, through the Brazilian Space Agency, the Brazilian Armed Forces launched several satellites to orbit, like the SGDC-1 and the Amazônia-1 in order to integrate the MoD's military communications with the three branches across the country, also to conduct imagery intelligence, reconnaissance and earth observation operations. Several other are planned to 2020s.

SISFRON
The Integrated Border Monitoring System (SISFRON) is a border system developed by the Brazilian Army for supporting operational employment decisions, operating in an integrated manner with all defense systems in the country, whose purpose is to strengthen the presence and capacity for monitoring and action in the national land border strip. Was conceived at the initiative of the Army Command, as a result of the approval of the National Defense Strategy in 2008, which guides the organization of the Armed Forces. The SISFRON are deployed along the 16,886 kilometers of the border line, favoring the employment of organizations subordinate to the North, West, Southern and the Amazon military commands.

Planned projects

Modernization of the Leopard 1A5 BR
Since 2020, the Army's plan the modernization of the fleet of the main tank Leopard 1A5 BR. The Bulletin No. 52/2020 with the Directive EME/C Ex No. 279, from 17 December 2020, orders the creation of a committee to study the program. The project proposes to obtain 116 modernized units, of the 220 in operation, extending their useful life until 2037. The Army's also plans a program for the acquisition of a new class of main tanks until 2030s.

Assault gun 8×8
In December 2020, the Army launched a program to obtain 221 units of an 8 x 8 assault gun, for the replacement of the EE-9 Cascavel in operation since 1974. The reported contenders of the program was reported to be the Iveco Centauro II, General Dynamics LAV 700, Norinco ST1, Patria AMV XP, ARTEC Boxer and the Elbit Eitan.

155mm wheeled armored self-propelled howitzer
In July 2021, the Army's launched a program to obtain new units of a wheeled armored self-propelled howitzer of 155mm.

Medium-range air defense system
The Ministry of Defence will start in the 2020s, the acquisition of a medium-range air defense system. In December 2020, the MoD approved the prerequisites. The system will be operated by the three branches of the Brazilian Armed Forces, in order to reduce operational costs and to facilitating the integration between all systems already in operation in the forces. The baterry will have to comply with the following operational requirements: must be able to effectively engage aerospace threats simultaneously in a minimum horizontal engagement range not exceeding 2,000 meters; maximum horizontal engagement range not less than 40,000 meters; minimum vertical engagement range not exceeding 50 meters; and maximum vertical engagement range not less than 15,000 meters. The system will be capable to engage fixed-wing aircraft, helicopters, UAVs, cruise missiles and guided bombs.

See also

Future of the Brazilian Navy
Future of the Brazilian Air Force

References

Brazilian Army
Military planning